The Hadley Rille meteorite was a meteorite discovered on the Moon at coordinates 26° 26' 0" N, 3° 39' 20" E, or Station 9A, during the Apollo 15 mission in 1971. It was the second meteorite to be discovered on a Solar System body other than the Earth. The first was the Bench Crater meteorite, discovered in 1969 during the Apollo 12 mission.

Characteristics
Within the soil sample 15602,29 collected near Hadley Rille was found an object in the  size. It is classed as an enstatite chondrite (EH) by the Meteoritical Society.

See also
Glossary of meteoritics
Bench Crater meteorite
Big Bertha (lunar sample)
Hadley–Apennine (Moon)
Heat Shield Rock (Mars – Meridiani Planum meteorite)
List of Martian meteorites
List of meteorites on Mars

References

Apollo 15
Meteorites found on the Moon
David Scott